In J. R. R. Tolkien's fantasy writings, Isengard is a large fortress in Nan Curunír, the Wizard's Vale, in the western part of Middle-earth. In the fantasy world, the name of the fortress is described as a translation of Angrenost, a word in the elvish language Sindarin, which Tolkien invented. (In fact it is an Old English word meaning "iron enclosure".)

In The Lord of the Rings, Orthanc, a tower at the centre of Isengard, is the home of the Wizard Saruman. He had been ensnared by the Dark Lord Sauron through the tower's palantír, a far-seeing crystal ball able to communicate with others like it. Saruman had bred Orcs in Isengard, in imitation of Sauron's forces, to be ready for war with Rohan. The Orcs cut down many trees in the forest of the Ents, who retaliated by destroying Isengard while the army of Orcs was away attacking Rohan at Helm's Deep. However, the Ents were unable to harm the tower of Orthanc. Saruman, isolated in the tower, was visited by some members of the Fellowship of the Ring; his staff was broken by the Wizard Gandalf.

Isengard has been described by Tolkien scholars as an industrial hell, and as an illustration of the homogeneity of evil, in contrast to the evident diversity of the free societies of Middle-earth, including those of the Elves, Dwarves, and Gondor. Others have compared it to Vichy France, and its proposed governor on behalf of Mordor, the Mouth of Sauron, to a traitorous Quisling.

Fictional history

Construction

The Númenóreans in exile built Isengard in the Second Age as a walled circular enclosure, with the tower of Orthanc at its centre. It lay just outside the north-western corner of Rohan, guarding the Fords of Isen from enemy incursions into Calenardhon together with the fortress of Aglarond to its south.

The river Isen or Angren began on Methedras, the southernmost peak of the Misty Mountains. Methedras stood behind Isengard, forming its northern wall. The rest of its perimeter consisted of a large wall, the Ring of Isengard, breached only by the inflow of the river at the north-east through a portcullis, and the gate of Isengard at the south, at both shores of the river. For most of its history, Isengard was a green and pleasant place, with many fruiting trees.

Orthanc was built towards the end of the Second Age by men of Gondor from four many-sided columns of rock joined by an unknown process and then hardened. No known weapon could harm it. Its only entrance was at the top of a high stair, and above that was a small window and balcony. It housed one of the palantírs of the South Kingdom, and was guarded by a warden.

Depopulation

In the Third Age the land of Calenardhon became depopulated, and the last warden of Orthanc was recalled to Minas Tirith. Isengard remained guarded by a small company, led by a hereditary captain. Contact with Minas Tirith gradually decreased and eventually ceased altogether. When Cirion, Steward of Gondor, gave Calenardhon to the Éothéod, becoming the land of Rohan, Isengard was the sole fortress retained by Gondor north of the Ered Nimrais. The small guard intermarried much with the Dunlendings, until the fortress became Dunlending in all but name. The tower of Orthanc however remained locked and inaccessible to the Dunlendings, as the Steward of Gondor alone held the keys in Minas Tirith. The line of hereditary Captains died out, and during the rule of Rohan's King Déor, Isengard became openly hostile to the Rohirrim. Using Isengard as their base, the Dunlendings continually raided Rohan until during the rule of Helm Hammerhand, the Dunlending lord Freca and his son Wulf nearly managed to destroy the Rohirrim. The Rohirrim fought off the invaders and blockaded Isengard, eventually taking it.

Gondor did not wish to relinquish its claim to the tower, but lacked the strength to garrison it. A solution presented itself to the Steward of Gondor, Beren, as the Wizard Saruman suddenly reappeared from the East, offering to guard Isengard. Beren gladly gave him the keys to Orthanc. At first he resided there as Warden of the Tower on behalf of Gondor. The valley became known as Nan Curunír, the "Wizard's Vale". On Sauron's return to Mordor, Saruman asserted himself as Lord of Isengard.

War of the Ring

During the War of the Ring, Saruman prepared for war against Rohan, defiling the valley of Isengard with deep pits where he bred large numbers of powerful warrior Orcs, Uruk-hai, smithing weapons in underground workshops full of machinery, and felling the valley's trees.

The Orcs of Isengard bore upon their shields the symbol of a White Hand on a black field, and on their helmets an S-rune to signify Saruman. A carved and painted White Hand of stone was set on a black pillar outside the gates of Isengard.

Treebeard, leader of the Ents, seeing that the Orcs would destroy his forest of Fangorn, led an army of Ents and Huorns to Isengard, destroyed it, and flooded it, leaving Saruman isolated in the impervious tower of Orthanc. The hobbits Merry Brandybuck and Pippin Took, as the new "doorwardens", received Théoden King of Rohan, Aragorn and the wizard Gandalf at the wrecked gates. Gandalf spoke with Saruman and broke his staff. Grima Wormtongue threw the Orthanc palantír, a stone of seeing, at the party; both Pippin and Aragorn later used it, seeing and deceiving Sauron as to the Fellowship's intentions.

Saruman was then locked in Orthanc and guarded by Treebeard, but was later set free, turning the tower's keys over to Treebeard before leaving and taking Gríma with him. Treebeard's main reason for letting Saruman go was that he could not bear to see any living thing caged. Saruman exploited this weakness, most likely using his power with words.

Restoration

During the Fourth Age, when Aragorn had been crowned as King Elessar ("Elfstone"), he visited Orthanc, finding there heirlooms of Isildur, among them the Elendilmir, the Star of Arnor, and the small gold case on a chain that Isildur had used to carry the One Ring, evidence that Saruman had found and apparently destroyed Isildur's remains. Isengard was restored, and the entire valley granted to the Ents. The Ents named the new forest the Treegarth of Orthanc. Orthanc became again a tower of the Reunited Kingdom of Gondor and Arnor.

Origins

Etymology

"Isengard" is from Old English īsen, "iron" and geard, "court, enclosure". The names, supposedly given by the Rohirrim, for Orthanc, the cunningly-built tower of Isengard, and for the Ents, the tree-giants of Fangorn forest who eventually destroy Isengard, are similarly in reality from Old English. Both are found in the poem The Ruin, which describes the ancient Roman ruins as orþanc, "skilful work", and enta geweorc, "the work of giants". Clark Hall gives the meanings of the noun orþanc as "intelligence, understanding, mind; cleverness, skill; skilful work, mechanical art", and as an adjective "ingenious, skilful". The Tolkien critic Tom Shippey suggests that Tolkien may have chosen to read the phrase also as "Orthanc, the Ent's fortress". Orthanc is said to mean "Mount Fang" in Sindarin.

Illustrations

Tolkien made detailed sketches of Isengard and Orthanc, published in J. R. R. Tolkien: Artist and Illustrator, as he developed his conception of them.

Interpretations

Industrial hell

The scholar of English literature Charles A. Huttar describes Isengard as an "industrial hell". He quotes Tolkien's description of Isengard, supplying his own emphasis on Tolkien's words: "tunneled .. circle .. dark .. deep .. graveyard of unquiet dead .. the ground trembled .. treasuries .. furnaces .. iron wheels .. endlessly .. lit from beneath .. venomous." Huttar comments: "The imagery is familiar, its connotations plain. This is yet another hell [after Moria and Mordor]." All the same, he writes, the tower of Orthanc cannot but be admired, with its "marvellous shape" and wonderful, ancient strength; he supposes that for Tolkien, technology could neither be "wholeheartedly embraced nor utterly rejected".

Shippey, discussing Saruman's character, notes several facts about him: Treebeard's comment that "He has a mind of metal and wheels"; that Isengard means "Irontown"; that the Ents are attacked in Isengard with "a kind of napalm [or] perhaps ... [given] Tolkien's own experience, a Flammenwerfer". Shippey concludes that Saruman had been led into "wanton pollution ... by something corrupting in the love of machines", which he connects to "Tolkien's own childhood image of industrial ugliness ... Sarehole Mill, with its literally bone-grinding owner".

David D. Oberhelman, writing in the J.R.R. Tolkien Encyclopedia, states, following Anne C. Petty, that there are multiple "industrial 'hells' in Tolkien's work, such as Saruman's blighted, machine-ridden Isengard". He notes that its prototype was the fallen Vala Morgoth's subterranean fortress, Angband, whose name meant "Iron Prison" or "Hell of Iron".

Vichy status

Isengard is the promised reward for the nameless "Mouth of Sauron", as soon as Gondor and its allies had surrendered. In his words in front of the Black Gate:

Shippey compares Sauron's offer to the Vichy treaty imposed on France after its surrender in 1940: "sovereignty over the disputed territory of Ithilien [East of the Anduin], the Alsace-Lorraine of Middle-earth, is to be transferred", and in the lands to the West "a demilitarized zone, with what one can only call Vichy status, which will pay war-reparations, and be governed [from Isengard] by what one can again only call a Quisling."

Homogeneity of evil

During the War of the Ring, Isengard was controlled by Saruman until the fortress's destruction, but Saruman had become "more like Sauron than he realizes", like him believing in "supremacy through absolute power", and unintentionally a pupil of Sauron, having against Elrond's advice "stud[ied] too deeply the arts of the enemy". The Tolkien scholars Wayne Hammond and Christina Scull note that the palantír in Orthanc had formed what Gandalf called "some link between Isengard and Mordor, which I have not yet fathomed": the link was that Sauron had used the stone to take control of Saruman, and through him his forces of Orcs. In The Two Towers, Tolkien himself described Saruman's Isengard as "only a little copy, a child's model or a slave's flattery ... [of Sauron's] vast fortress, armoury, prison, furnace of great power, Barad-dûr." The Tolkien scholar Brian Rosebury writes that Tolkien was making the point that whereas good government in free societies like those of Gondor, the Dwarves, the Elves, the Drúedain, and the Shire leads to diversity, "evil tends to homogeneity".

Adaptations

In Peter Jackson's films of The Lord of the Rings, Isengard and Orthanc were based on Alan Lee's illustrations and modelled under the direction of Richard Taylor; Lee worked as the project's conceptual artist in New Zealand throughout the making of the film trilogy. In post-production, the long shots of the Orthanc model were chroma keyed with panoramic views of the Mount Earnslaw / Pikirakatahi region and Mount Aspiring National Park near Queenstown and Glenorchy, New Zealand.

References

Primary
This list identifies each item's location in Tolkien's writings.

Secondary

Sources

 
 
 
 
 
 
 
 
 
 
 
 
 
 
 
 

Fictional elements introduced in 1954
Middle-earth castles and fortresses
Middle-earth realms